"Remember When (Push Rewind)" is a song by American recording artist Chris Wallace, taken from his debut studio album, Push Rewind (2013). It was released as the album's lead single on June 12, 2012.

Track listing

Writing and inspiration
The song is about looking back and wanting to relive your past. He said in an interview, that the underlying message of the song is positive in that "Even if things don’t work out and I can’t change them, I’m still glad it happened. And the worst case scenario is that you learn a lesson.” The song is based on Chris' ex-girlfriend, who broke up with him when his band, The White Tie Affair, started to take off.

Critical reception
The song has received very positive reviews from music critics. It was named on iTunes as one of the "Best Songs of 2012". MTV has said that, “critics are going so far as to call him the male Katy Perry, a compliment if we ever heard one.  Actually, we totally agree!” and called him a "one man dance party".

Live performances
Chris performed the song on VH1's Big Morning Buzz Live on November 13, 2012. It was also his national television debut. On January 23, 2013, he performed the song, along with "Keep Me Crazy", on Jimmy Kimmel Live!. On February 20, 2013, he performed the song on Live! with Kelly and Michael.

Music video
The music video for the song was released on June 20, 2012. The music video was directed and produced by Justin Baldoni. In the music video, Chris is performing at a house party. The story shows the aftermath of the party and Chris pushes rewind and tries to change the past to win back his ex-girlfriend.

Charts

References

2012 debut singles
2012 songs
Songs written by Matt Rad